Mohammad Bagus Nirwanto (born 3 May 1993) is an Indonesian professional footballer who plays as a right back for Liga 1 club PSS Sleman.

Honours

Club
PSCS Cilacap
 Indonesia Soccer Championship B: 2016
PSS Sleman
 Liga 2: 2018
Menpora Cup third place: 2021

References

External links
 Bagus Nirwanto at Soccerway
 Bagus Nirwanto at Liga Indonesia

1993 births
Living people
People from Sidoarjo Regency
Sportspeople from East Java
Indonesian footballers
Association football defenders
Indonesian Premier Division players
Liga 1 (Indonesia) players
Liga 2 (Indonesia) players
Deltras F.C. players
Borneo F.C. players
PSCS Cilacap players
PSS Sleman players